Animorphs is a 2000 game for Game Boy Color. It is based upon the Scholastic book series Animorphs by K. A. Applegate.

Gameplay

The game operates in a series of turn-based battles during combat. In a manner similar to the Pokémon video games, the object of Animorphs is to fight and defeat various animals and aliens in order to gain the morph (DNA) of that creature. Sometimes, the player can use the animal's acquired skills outside combat. For example, snakes crawl up walls, fish swim, and bird morphs take to the air. The game saves using a password system.

Development
The game was developed by American studio Runny-Fun and published by Ubi Soft. Little is currently known about the game's development history.

The gameplay takes the player through four missions, but a secret fifth mission was discovered in 2016. This one is only accessible via a hardcoded password.

Reception
Critical reception of the game was generally low. Marc Nix of IGN described the game as "pat and boring, but also silly in difficulty at times since there's little guiding your path and no real clue to the strategy." He gave it a score of 3.0 out of 10. Nintendo Power was a bit more favorable in its review of the game, giving it 3 out of 5.

References

External links
IGN page
GameSpot page

2000 video games
Alien invasions in video games
Game Boy Color games
Game Boy Color-only games
Video games about extraterrestrial life
Video games based on novels
Video games developed in the United States
Works based on Animorphs